West Youyi Road is a station on Line 1 of the Shanghai Metro. This station is part of the northern extension of that line.

References

Shanghai Metro stations in Baoshan District
Line 1, Shanghai Metro
Railway stations in China opened in 2007
Railway stations in Shanghai